The Down county hurling team represents Down GAA, the county board of the Gaelic Athletic Association, in the Gaelic sport of hurling. The team competes in the Christy Ring Cup and the National Hurling League.

Down's home ground is Páirc Esler, Newry. The team's manager is Ronan Sheehan.

The team last won the Ulster Senior Championship in 1997, but has never won the All-Ireland Senior Championship or the National League.

History
Down played in the Leinster Minor Hurling Championship for three years in the 1970s, even playing Antrim in an unusual Leinster semi-final at Croke Park in 1979.

Although Down had not won the All-Ireland B championship in four final appearances, when the Ulster Senior Hurling Championship was revived, Down won titles in 1992, 1995 and 1997, losing the All-Ireland semi-finals by 14, 11 and 16 points.

Down defeated Kilkenny in a Division 1 match in 1993 by a scoreline of 1–12 to 1–11.

Down hurlers won the Christy Ring Cup for the first time in 2013, their greatest All-Ireland level success to date. This entitled them to enter the 2014 All-Ireland Senior Hurling Championship; however, Down opted to remain in the 2nd on this occasion.

In 2020, Down caused an upset in the Christy Ring Cup by knocking Offaly out in the semi-final. The team did so in a first ever inter-county hurling penalty shootout. The final against Kildare was scheduled for the one hundredth anniversary of Bloody Sunday, with promotion to the 2021 Joe McDonagh Cup achieved by both finalists.

South Down
In 2007, the GAA announced that a hurling team from "South Down" (i.e. excluding the Ards peninsula) would compete in parallel to the main Down team, to encourage hurling in an area of growing population where the game had not been strong. While players from all of Down were eligible for the main Down team, Ards players could not play for South Down. The new team competed in the 2008 National Hurling League, recording their first win by beating Cavan at Ballela, scoring 4–15 to Cavan's 0–9. South Down then competed in the 2008 Nicky Rackard Cup and in the Lory Meagher Cup until 2011.

Managerial history
 2009: Jim McKernan

Players

Notable players

All Stars
All Stars: 1
1992 Gerard McGrattan
Christy Ring Cup Champion 15 Awards: 10
2005 Garth Johnson & Martin Coulter
2007 Graham Clarke
2009 Finton Conway & Sean Ennis & Ruairi McGrattan
2010 Paul Braniff
2011 Paul Braniff
2012 Paul Braniff
2013 Paul Braniff, Gareth Johnson, Conor Woods & Patrick Hughes
2014 Conor Woods
2015 Danny Toner & Fintan Conway
2016 John McManus & Caolan Taggart
2017 Michael Hughes & Eoghan Sands
2018 Dáithí Sands
2019 Caolan Taggart & Dáithi Sands

Honours
Official honours, with additions noted.

National
All-Ireland Senior Hurling Championship
 Semi-finalists (2): 1992, 1995
Quarter-finalists (1): 1997
All-Ireland Senior B Hurling Championship/Joe McDonagh Cup
 Runners-up (6): 1988
 All-Ireland Intermediate Hurling Championship/Christy Ring Cup
 Winners (1): 2013
 Runners-up (4): 2005, 2009, 2019, 2020
All-Ireland Junior Hurling Championship/Nicky Rackard Cup
 Winners (1): 1964
 Runners-up (1): 2004
National Hurling League Division 2
 Winners (1): 2004
National Hurling League Division 2B
 Winners (1): 2020

Provincial
Ulster Senior Hurling Championship
 Winners (4): 1941, 1992, 1995, 1997
 Runners-up (19): 1930, 1939, 1940, 1989, 1990, 1991, 1993, 1994, 1996, 2001, 2002, 2004, 2005, 2007, 2008, 2009, 2010, 2013, 2015
Ulster Intermediate Hurling Championship
 Winners (4): 1968, 1971, 1972, 1998
Ulster Junior Hurling Championship
 Winners (7): 1956, 1960, 1962, 1964, 1967, 1992, 1993
Ulster Under-21 Hurling Championship
 Winners (11): 1969, 1971, 1975, 1977, 1983, 1984, 1985, 1987, 1990, 2003, 2004
Ulster Minor Hurling Championship
 Winners (13): 1930, 1932, 1934, 1957, 1971, 1972, 1976, 1978, 1984, 1985, 1989, 1994, 2012

References

 
County hurling teams